Calyptogonia is a genus of ground beetles in the family Carabidae. There are at least two described species in Calyptogonia.

Species
These two species belong to the genus Calyptogonia:
 Calyptogonia atra Sloane, 1920  (Australia)
 Calyptogonia lynetteae Baehr, 2013  (Australia)

References

Migadopinae